Margarita Syradoeva (born 6 April 1995) is a Russian professional racing cyclist, who currently rides for UCI Women's Continental Team . She rode in the women's road race at the 2016 UCI Road World Championships, but she did not finish the race.

References

External links
 

1995 births
Living people
Russian female cyclists
Sportspeople from Pskov Oblast